Fraser Speirs is a Glasgow-based harmonica player. Originally trained as a medical illustrator, Speirs has been performing for over 30 years and is now an internationally known performer and teacher.

He continues to perform with such musicians as Tam White, James Grant and Carol Kidd.

References

External links 
 Fraser Speirs' homepage

Scottish folk musicians
Living people
Medical illustrators
Year of birth missing (living people)